Yogyakarta International Airport Rail Link is an airport rail link service in Special Region of Yogyakarta and Central Java, Indonesia, operated by Kereta Api Indonesia. Launched on 6 May 2019, it has had two routes, – and Yogyakarta–Wojo–, before changed into single Yogyakarta– route in 2021 after a spur line to the airport was fully built.

The service is one of the options to reach Yogyakarta International Airport which replaced Adisutjipto International Airport as the main airport in Yogyakarta and surrounding areas. The train used to terminate at Wojo Station, due to the direct rail connection to the airport that was yet to complete. Wojo Station was considered the closest active station to the airport as the closer Kedundang Station is currently inactive and under reconstruction. There were Perum DAMRI shuttle buses from Wojo Station to the airport, which has  distance.

The rail connection to the Yogyakarta International Airport is planned to be completed by 2021. It was completed on 17 September.

Stations
All stations which served by the service have exclusive comfortable waiting room for the airport passengers and it is provided with international standard toilet.

See also

 Rail transport in Indonesia

References

Airport rail links in Indonesia
Transport in the Special Region of Yogyakarta
Passenger rail transport in Indonesia
Railway lines opened in 2019
Rapid transit in Indonesia